
The CD Singles '88–91' is a box set of Morrissey's first ten singles as a solo artist, from "Suedehead" (1988) to "Pregnant for the Last Time" (1991).

Contents 
Although each disc contains the three or four songs from the original Compact Disc edition, they are housed in a cardboard sleeve (instead of a jewel case) and replicate the 12-inch artwork, with the titles of songs that were exclusive to CD written on afterwards.

Several of the A and B-sides on these singles appeared on the compilations Bona Drag (1990) and My Early Burglary Years (1998), while others were made available again for the first time since their first release, including "I Know Very Well How I Got My Name", "East West", and the full version of "Will Never Marry".

A number of cover versions also appear: "East West" by Herman's Hermits, The Jam's "That's Entertainment"; T. Rex's "Cosmic Dancer"; Bradford's "Skin Storm"; and a version of "Sweet and Tender Hooligan" by Morrissey's former band The Smiths.

Packaging 
The ten discs are housed in a flip-top box. The cover image is from a photograph by Anton Corbijn. It first appeared in the CD booklet for Morrissey's debut album Viva Hate.

Reactions 
In a 4/10 review, the NME described the set thus:

Writing for AllMusic, Stephen Thomas Erlewine was more enthusiastic:

In September 2000 the set was followed up by The CD Singles '91-95'.

Track listing

CD 1 
 "Suedehead"
 "I Know Very Well How I Got My Name"
 "Hairdresser on Fire"
 "Oh Well, I'll Never Learn"

CD 2 
 "Everyday Is Like Sunday"
 "Sister I'm a Poet"
 "Disappointed"
 "Will Never Marry"

CD 3 
 "The Last of the Famous International Playboys"
 "Lucky Lisp"
 "Michael's Bones"

CD 4 
 "Interesting Drug"
 "Such a Little Thing Makes Such a Big Difference"
 "Sweet and Tender Hooligan" (live)

CD 5 
 "Ouija Board, Ouija Board"
 "Yes I Am Blind"
 "East West"

CD 6 
 "November Spawned a Monster"
 "He Knows I'd Love to See Him"
 "Girl Least Likely To"

CD 7 
 "Piccadilly Palare"
 "Get Off the Stage"
 "At Amber"

CD 8 
 "Our Frank"
 "Journalists Who Lie"
 "Tony the Pony"

CD 9 
 "Sing Your Life"
 "That's Entertainment"
 "The Loop"

CD 10 
 "Pregnant for the Last Time"
 "Skin Storm"
 "Cosmic Dancer" (live)
 "Disappointed" (live)

There is also a 7" vinyl version of this box set.

References 

Morrissey compilation albums
Albums produced by Stephen Street
Albums produced by Clive Langer
Albums produced by Alan Winstanley
2000 compilation albums
EMI Records compilation albums